is a Japanese actor. He has appeared in several dramas. One of his most notable roles was Souta Mogami/BoukenBlue in the Super Sentai series GoGo Sentai Boukenger. He has recently been accepted into the D-Boys acting troupe. He also acted in the movie Kindan no koi. A gardening enthusiast, Mikami currently hosts the gardening show Shumi no Engei on NHK Educational TV.

Career

Television
Kyōryū Sentai Zyuranger: Satoshi's friend (TV Asahi, 1992/1993)
GoGo Sentai Boukenger: Souta Mogami/BoukenBlue (2006/2007)
Bihada Sentai Sparanger: SpaYellow (2007)
Shumi no Engei: Host 
Kamen Rider Drive: Hiroki Nikaido (2015)
Kamen Rider Saber: Kenshin Nagamine (2020)

Cinema
 Worst By Chance - Minor Role (2003)
 Swing Girls - Yusuke (2004)
 GoGo Sentai Boukenger The Movie: The Greatest Precious - Souta Mogami/BoukenBlue (Toei, 2006)
 GoGo Sentai Boukenger vs. Super Sentai - Souta Mogami/BoukenBlue (Toei, 2007)
 Juken Sentai Gekiranger vs Boukenger - Souta Mogami/BoukenBlue (Toei, 2008)
 Kindan no Koi - Ritsu (2008)
 Hoshisuna no Shima no Chiisana Tenshi ~Mermaid Smile~ (2010)

Internet Series
 Tokyo Prom Queen - Takeshi (2008)

References

External links
Watanabe Pro Profile
Personal blog

Japanese male actors
1983 births
Living people
People from Niigata (city)